Justin Petrus Coetzee (born 12 June 1984) is a South-Africa-born Australian cricketer who previously played for Western Australia. He is an all-rounder who bats left-handed and is a left-arm medium bowler.

Career
Coetzee first came to notice playing for the Western Australian 2nd XI side against the touring Pakistan XI in 2004, when he took 10 wickets in the match. After playing a few more games for the second XI in the 2004-05 summer, he did not make his senior debut for the Warriors until 2009, when he was selected in a Twenty20 match against Queensland at the WACA Ground.  He did not bowl and dropped a difficult chance, but was more successful with the bat, scoring 23 not out from 15 balls to be the second top scorer for the Warriors in their 62 run loss.

References

External links
 

1984 births
Living people
South African expatriates in Australia
Western Australia cricketers
South African cricketers
Cricketers from Durban